West Germany competed at the Olympic Games between 1952 and 1988. While in  1952  - Germany's first Olympics after World War II and the Partitions of Germany - there was a de facto West German team, given East Germany refused to collaborate, its results are counted towards Germany. Likewise, between 1956 and 1964 both countries competed together under the United Team of Germany flag. It was not until 1968 that a full-fledged West German team appeared, and it competed in all the Olympics but the 1980 Summer Olympics - as it supported the 1980 Summer Olympics boycott - until 1988. Afterwards, the German reunification in 1990 reestablished the German team.

Participation

Timeline of participation

Hosted Games 

West Germany has hosted the Games on one occasion.

Medal tables

Medals by Summer Games

Medals by Winter Games

Medals by summer sport

Medals by winter sport

See also
Germany at the Olympics

External links